Choqabdar (also Romanized as Choqābdār; also known as Cheghābdār) is a village in Dorud Rural District, in the Central District of Dorud County, Lorestan Province, Iran. At the 2006 census, its population was 3,403, in 734 families.

References 

Towns and villages in Dorud County